Slocum  may refer to:

People
 Bill Slocum, American politician
 Craig Slocum, American actor
 Frances Slocum, an adopted member of the Miami tribe
 Frederick Slocum, American astronomer
 Heath Slocum, American golfer
 Henry Slocum (tennis player), a professional athlete and Hall of Fame member
 Henry Warner Slocum, a US Civil War Major General
 Jamie Slocum, American singer-songwriter
 Jerry Slocum, historian, author about, and collector of mechanical puzzles
 John Slocum, prophet of the Indian Shaker Church
 John J. Slocum, diplomat and bibliophile
 John W. Slocum, American lawyer, politician, and judge
 Joshua Slocum, the first man to sail solo around the world 
 Kay Slocum, medieval and music historian, and violist
 Lois Tripp Slocum (1899–1951), American astronomer
 Matt Slocum, guitarist and composer for the band Sixpence None the Richer
 Matt Slocum (keyboardist), southern jam band pianist
 Peleg Slocum, American Quaker
 R. C. Slocum, American football coach 
 Ray Slocum (1936–2013), Australian Rules footballer who played for the Fitzroy Football Club in the VFL
 Robert Slocum, American botanist and biologist
 Shawn Slocum, American football coach 
 Slocum (K-9), fictional character in the television series K-9
 William J. Slocum, American sportswriter
 William Slocum Groesbeck, American politician

Places

Communities
 Slocum, Ohio, an unincorporated community in Scioto County
 Slocum, Rhode Island, a small village in the town of North Kingstown
 Slocum, Texas, an unincorporated community in Anderson County
 Slocum Township, Luzerne County, Pennsylvania, a township

Other
 Fort Slocum, in the city of New Rochelle, New York
 Frances Slocum State Park, a park in Luzerne County, Pennsylvania
 Slocum (crater) on the moon, named after Frederick Slocum
 Slocums River, a tidal river in southeastern Massachusetts
 Slocum's River Reserve, an open space preserve in Dartmouth, Massachusetts

Other
 PS General Slocum, a steamship destroyed by fire in the East River of New York City in 1904
 Slocum (westerns), a series of "adult-oriented" western novels by various authors (writing as Jake Logan)
 Slocum and Hannah Howland House, a historic building in Cayuga County, New York
 Slocum House (Vancouver, Washington), a historic building
 Slocum massacre, a racial conflict that took place in Slocum, Texas, in 1910
 Slocum stone, a synthetically grown opal

See also
 
 
 Slocombe (disambiguation)
 Slocumb (disambiguation)